Amorphoscelis siebersi is a species of praying mantis found in Borneo.

References

Amorphoscelis
Insects of Borneo
Insects described in 1933